Cody Lambert (born December 2, 1961) in Artesia, New Mexico is an American former professional rodeo cowboy. He specialized in  saddle bronc riding and bull riding. He was also a co-founder and vice president of the Professional Bull Riders (PBR).  He created the protective vest that professional bull riders have been required to wear for many years, after witnessing the death of his friend, Lane Frost at the Cheyenne Frontier Days rodeo in Cheyenne, Wyoming, on July 30, 1989.

Early and personal life
Cody Lambert is the son of racehorse trainer Cliff Lambert, who was the first jockey to win the All American Futurity at Ruidoso Downs aboard Galobar in 1959. Cody has three siblings, brothers Chuck and Casey Lambert, the latter a successful racehorse jockey, and sister Cheyann. Cody lives in Bowie, Texas, on a ranch with his wife, Leanne, and their horses and dogs.

Contestant career
Cody Lambert, Lane Frost, Ty Murray, Jim Sharp, and Tuff Hedeman frequently rode the rodeo circuit together and were known as the "Wolfpack" during that time.

Lambert retired from bull riding at the end of the 1996 PBR World Finals. While an active rider and also when retired, he served as the PBR’s vice president. When retired as a contestant, he also served as a PBR bull riding judge, and as the PBR’s livestock director.

Coaching career
In 2022, after retiring as the PBR’s Director of Livestock during the conclusion of that year’s PBR World Finals in May, Lambert became the head coach of the Texas Rattlers, one of eight bull riding teams of the PBR’s Team Series, which debuted that year. 
In late September 2022, the Texas Rattlers won the event at Thunder Days in Ridgedale, Missouri; the hometown event of rival team, the Missouri Thunder. Two weeks later, the Rattlers won their own hometown event at Rattler Days in Fort Worth, Texas. The very next weekend, the Rattlers won their third event in a row at Ridge Rider Days in Glendale, Arizona; the hometown event of rival team, the Arizona Ridge Riders. The Rattlers ended up finishing in third place at the conclusion of the inaugural PBR Team Series season.

Honors
In 1996, Lambert was one of the inaugural inductees into the PBR's Ring of Honor.

In 2002, Lambert was inducted into the Texas Cowboy Hall of Fame. Inducted for his rodeo accomplishments, the museum features many of Lambert's personal items used during his rodeo career.

In 2012, Lambert was inducted into the Texas Rodeo Cowboy Hall of Fame.

In 2020, Lambert was inducted into the National Cowboy & Western Heritage Museum’s Rodeo Hall of Fame.

In Media
His name ended up being used as the character name for Sasha Mitchell’s character on the television show Step By Step.
 
In the Lane Frost biographical drama, 8 Seconds (1994), Lambert was portrayed by Red Mitchell.

References

1961 births
Living people
Bull riders
Saddle bronc riders
People from Bowie, Texas
People from Taylor County, Texas
Professional Bull Riders: Heroes and Legends